The Wyoming Senate is the upper house of the Wyoming State Legislature. There are 31 Senators in the Senate, representing an equal number of constituencies across Wyoming, each with a population of at least 17,000. The Senate meets at the Wyoming State Capitol in Cheyenne.

Members of the Senate serve four year terms without term limits. Term limits were declared unconstitutional by the Wyoming Supreme Court in 2004, overturning a decade-old law that had restricted Senators to three terms (twelve years).

Like other upper houses of state and territorial legislatures and the federal U.S. Senate, the Wyoming Senate can confirm or reject gubernatorial appointments to the state cabinet, commissions, boards, or justices to the Wyoming Supreme Court.

Composition of the Senate

Leadership
Wyoming, along with Arizona, Maine, and Oregon, is one of the four U.S. states to have abolished the Office of the Lieutenant Governor, a position which for most upper houses of state legislatures and indeed for the U.S. Congress (with the Vice President) is the head of the legislative body. Instead, a separate position of Senate President is in place, removed from the Wyoming executive branch.

The current Senate President is Republican Ogden Driskill of District 1 (Devils Tower).

Members of the Wyoming Senate

History

Women in the Senate

Past composition of the Senate

See also
Wyoming State Capitol
Wyoming State Legislature
Wyoming House of Representatives

References

External links
Wyoming Senate
Project Vote Smart – State Senate of Wyoming
The Wyoming Liberty Index

State upper houses in the United States
Cheyenne, Wyoming
Wyoming Legislature